Constituency NA-261 (Pishin-cum-Ziarat) was a constituency for the National Assembly of Pakistan.

Election 2002 

General elections were held on 10 Oct 2002. Haji Gul Muhammad Dummar of Muttahida Majlis-e-Amal won by 37,856 votes.

Election 2008 

General elections were held on 18 Feb 2008. Molvi Agha Muhammad of Muttahida Majlis-e-Amal won by 30,611 votes.

Election 2013 

General elections were held on 11 May 2013. Moulvi Agha Muhammad of JUI-F won by 48,712 votes and became the member of National Assembly.

References

External links 
Election result's official website

NA-261
Abolished National Assembly Constituencies of Pakistan